Fastway is the debut studio album by British heavy metal band Fastway, released in April 1983.

Founding member Pete Way (ex bass guitar player with UFO) did not play on the album, because by the time the recording sessions began Way left the band. He soon formed another band, Waysted. The bass guitar parts on the album were actually played by Rafaelito Benitez. He worked in the studio where the album was recorded and when Pete Way (who was meant to be there) didn't show up that day, Benitez offered to play bass for the album. He came up with the bass lines and remains uncredited for the album.

The album has been reissued as a two-fer with the second Fastway album, All Fired Up; however, that edition omits the song "Far Far from Home", bonus track featured on the standalone CD release of the first album.

UK-based record label Rock Candy Records has since re-issued the album with additional liner notes and bonus tracks, including B-sides and BBC sessions.

Track listing
All tracks composed by Fastway

 Originally, "Far Far from Home" was a separate promotional single, included in the first vinyl LP pressings. It was not on the original cassette versions, and not included in subsequent LP editions, but is included as a track on the compact disc edition.

Personnel

Fastway
 Dave King - vocals, harmonica
 "Fast" Eddie Clarke - guitar
 Jerry Shirley - drums

Additional musicians
 Mick Feat - bass guitar (uncredited)

Production
Eddie Kramer - producer, engineer, arrangements with Fastway
Alan Douglas, Tim Hunt - engineers
Howard Gray - assistant engineer

Charts

Album

Singles

References

1983 debut albums
Fastway (band) albums
Albums produced by Eddie Kramer
Columbia Records albums
New Wave of British Heavy Metal albums